The Linzer Sanden is a geologic formation in Austria. It preserves fossils dating back to the Paleogene period.

See also 
 List of fossiliferous stratigraphic units in Austria

References

External links 
 

Geologic formations of Austria
Oligocene Series of Europe
Paleogene Austria
Chattian Stage
Sandstone formations
Paleontology in Austria